Popokabaka Territory is a territory of the Democratic Republic of the Congo.  It is located in the Kwango province. The territory is divided into three sectors: Yonso, Popokabaka and Lufuna.
The Kwango River runs through the territory.
The administrative center is the city of Popokabaka.

References

Territories of Kwango Province